The 1906 Campeonato Paulista, organized by the LPF (Liga Paulista de Football), was the 5th season of São Paulo's top association football league. Germânia won the title for the 1st time. No teams were relegated and the top scorers were Germânia's Hermann Friese and Internacional's Leônidas with 7 goals.

System
The championship was disputed in a double-round robin system, with the team with the most points winning the title.

Championship

Before the start of the championship, a split happened between the players and officials of Paulistano, with many of the former leaving to join AA das Palmeiras.

The previous champions went out of the running for the title quickly, as Paulistano was still trying to rebuild its team and São Paulo Athletic was in decline, so the title was mostly disputed between Palmeiras and Germânia.

After a string of poor performances, capped with a 1-9 loss to Internacional, São Paulo Athletic withdrew from the championship. Later, Mackenzie also withdrew, after the school shut down its sports department.

After AA das Palmeiras' last match, against Internacional, which would have secured the title for them, Internacional reported AA das Palmeiras to LPF claiming irregularities on ticket sales, and despite the fact that no irregularities were proven, LPF expelled AA das Palmeiras from the league and Germânia were declared champions instead. As a consequence, AA das Palmeiras broke with LPF, with both only reconciling in 1909, and the 1906 championship being struck from the league's records upon their reconciliation. However, years later, FPF retroactively declared all of LPF's Paulista championships as official, including the 1906 edition.

References

Campeonato Paulista seasons
Paulista